Dalla grovius is a species of butterfly in the family Hesperiidae. It is found in Ecuador and Peru.

Subspecies
Dalla grovius grovius - Ecuador
Dalla grovius amba Evans, 1955 - Ecuador
Dalla grovius floxa Evans, 1955 - Peru

References

Butterflies described in 1898
grovius
Hesperiidae of South America
Taxa named by Paul Mabille